Girls Aloud are an English-Irish girl group that were created on the ITV1 talent show Popstars: The Rivals in 2002. The group, consisting of Cheryl, Nadine Coyle, Sarah Harding, Nicola Roberts and Kimberley Walsh, have been successful in achieving a string of twenty consecutive top ten singles (including four number ones) and two number one albums in the UK. All their albums are certified platinum. Girls Aloud have become one of the few UK reality television acts to achieve continued success, amassing a fortune of £30 million by 2010.

Girls Aloud have been nominated for five BRIT Awards, winning Best Single for 2008's "The Promise" at the 2009 awards ceremony. They have also been awarded by members of the British media such as The Sun'''s Bizarre, Capital FM, Glamour, Heat, Popjustice, and Virgin Media.

BRIT Awards
The BRIT Awards are the British Phonographic Industry's annual pop music awards. Girls Aloud have been nominated five times, winning their first award in 2009.

|-
| align="center"| 2005
| rowspan="3" | Girls Aloud
| Best Pop Act
| 
|-
| align="center"| 2008
| rowspan="2" | Best British Group
| 
|-
| rowspan="2" align="center"| 2009
| 
|-
| "The Promise"
| Best British Single
| 
|-
| align="center"| 2010
| "The Promise (Live at the 2009 Brit Awards)"
| Best Live Performance at the Brit Awards
| 

BT Digital Music Awards
The BT Digital Music Awards, administered by BT Group, recognize artists "who are delivering the best in cutting-edge digital music entertainment." Girls Aloud won their sole nomination in 2004.

|-
| align="center"| 2004
| Girls Aloud
| Best Pop Artist
|
|-

Capital FM Awards
The Capital FM Awards are an annual awards ceremony administered by popular London radio station 95.8 Capital FM. Girls Aloud have been nominated six times, winning twice.

|-
| align="center"| 2004
| Girls Aloud
| Favourite UK Group
|
|-
| rowspan="3" align="center"| 2005
| Girls Aloud
| Favourite UK Group
|
|-
| What Will the Neighbours Say?| Favourite UK Album
|
|- 
| Girls Aloud
| Favourite Pop Act
|
|-
| rowspan="2" align="center"| 2008
| Girls Aloud
| London's Favourite UK Group
|
|-
| Girls Aloud
| News of the World Fabulous Award
|

Disney Channel Kids Awards
The Disney Channel Kids Awards was an annual awards ceremony held by Disney Channel in the United Kingdom and Ireland. Girls Aloud were nominated for three awards during the ceremony's run, winning one.

|-
| rowspan="2" align="center"| 2003
| Girls Aloud
| Best Newcomer
|
|-
| "Sound of the Underground"
| Best Single
|
|-
| align="center"| 2004
| "The Show"
| Best Single
|

Festival Awards

|-
| align="center"| 2006
| V Festival
| Favourite Pop Act at a Festival
|
|-
| align="center"| 2008
| Girls Aloud
| Best Pop Act
|

Glamour Woman of the Year Awards
The Glamour Woman of the Year Awards are given annually by Glamour magazine. Girls Aloud have been nominated for Band of the Year four times, winning three of the four times.

|-
| align="center"| 2004
| rowspan="4" | Girls Aloud
| rowspan="4" | Band of the Year
|
|-
| align="center"| 2005
|
|-
| align="center"| 2007
|
|-
| rowspan="2" align="center"| 2009
|

Heat Awards
The Heat Awards are organised by Heat magazine. Girls Aloud have won four out of their five nominations.

|-
| rowspan="5" align="center"| 2008
| Out of Control| Best Album
|
|-
| Girls Aloud
| Best Band
|
|-
| "The Promise"
| Best Single
|
|-

Music Producers Guild Awards
The Music Producers Guild Awards was created "to celebrate the creative talent and technical ability of the UK's music producers, engineers, mixers and re-mixers." Girls Aloud have won their sole nomination.

|-
| align="center"| 2009
| Tangled Up| Best Live Album of the Year
|

National Music Awards

|-
| align="center"| 2003
| Girls Aloud
| Best Newcomer
|
|-

Nickelodeon UK Kids' Choice Awards
The Nickelodeon UK Kids' Choice Awards is an annual awards show presented by Nickelodeon, based on the American and Australian formats. Girls Aloud have been three times, but have yet to win.

|-
| rowspan="1" align="center"| 2007
| Girls Aloud
| Best Band
|
|-
| align="center"| 2008
| Girls Aloud
| Best Band
|

O2 Silver Clef Awards
Girls Aloud were awarded the Heart Record of the Year Award for their single "See the Day" at the O2 Silver Clef Lunch, an annual awards ceremony honouring songwriting and performance in aid of Nordoff-Robbins Music Therapy. Nicola Roberts and Kimberley Walsh, members of the band, attended the awards presentation ceremony.

|-
| align="center"| 2005
| "See the Day"
| Heart Record of the Year Award
|
|-

Popjustice £20 Music Prize
The Popjustice £20 Music Prize is an annual prize awarded by a panel of judges organised by music website Popjustice to the singer(s) of the best British pop single of the past year. To qualify, a single must be by a British artist(s) and have been released within the 12 months prior to the award nominations in July. Girls Aloud have been nominated a record eight years, winning five of them.

|-
| align="center"| 2003
| "No Good Advice"
| Best British Pop Single
|
|-
| align="center"| 2004
| "The Show"
| Best British Pop Single
|
|-
| align="center"| 2005
| "Wake Me Up"
| Best British Pop Single
|
|-
| align="center"| 2006
| "Biology"
| Best British Pop Single
|
|-
| align="center"| 2007
| "Something Kinda Ooooh"
| Best British Pop Single
|
|-
| align="center"| 2008
| "Call the Shots"
| Best British Pop Single
|
|-
| align="center"| 2009
| "The Promise"
| Best British Pop Single
|
|-
| align="center"| 2013
| "Something New"
| Best British Pop Single
|
|-

Popjustice Readers Poll

|-
| rowspan="9" align="center"| 2008
| "The Promise"
| Best Single
|
|-
| Out of Control| Best Album
|
|-
| "Apologize"
| Worst Cover
|
|-
| "The Promise"
| Best Number 1 Single
|
|-
| Girls Aloud, Pet Shop Boys and Xenomania
| Best Collaboration
|
|-
| "The Promise"
| Best Dance Routine
|
|-
| Girls Aloud - "The Promise"
| Worst X Factor Performance
|
|-
| "The Promise"
| Most Overrated Song
|
|-
| Girls Aloud
| Best Pop Act of 2008
|
|-
| rowspan="3" align="center"| 2009
| "Untouchable"
| Best Single
|
|-
| "Untouchable"
| Best Video
|
|-
| "Untouchable"
| Artwork Fail
|
|-
| align="center"|2010
| rowspan="2"| Girls Aloud
| rowspan="2"| Established Act Most Likely to Save Pop (Not That It Needs Saving) in 2011
|
|-
| align="center"|2011
|
|-
| rowspan="9" align="center"| 2012
| "Something New"
| Best Single
|
|-
| "Beautiful 'Cause You Love Me"
| Worst Single
|
|-
| "Beautiful 'Cause You Love Me"
| Least Inspiring So-Called 'Motivational' Pop Song
|
|-
| Girls Aloud
| Best Comeback
|
|-
| Girls Aloud and Xenomania
| Best Collaboration
|
|-
| "Something New"
| Best Video
|
|-
| "Something New"
| Worst Video
|
|-
| Girls Aloud
| Act We Should Send to Eurovision in 2013
|
|-
| Girls Aloud
| Group Most Likely Splitting in 2013
|
|-
| align="center"| 2013
| Girls Aloud
| Live Act Who Comes Closest to Justifying Absurd Ticket Prices
|
|-

The Record of the Year
The Record of the Year is an award voted by the British public. The award began in 1998, and was televised on ITV before being dropped in 2006 after disagreements over the phone voting element. Since then it has been an online poll, administered through the Record of the Year website. Girls Aloud have been nominated once.

|-
| align="center"| 2004
| "Love Machine"
| The Record of the Year
|
|-

Smash Hits Poll Winners Party
The Smash Hits Poll Winners Party was an awards ceremony which ran from 1988 to 2005. Each award winner was voted by readers of the Smash Hits magazine.  It ended with the closure of the magazine in February 2006. Girls Aloud were only nominated once, winning their nomination.

|-
| align="center"| 2003
| Girls Aloud
| Hot New Talent
|
|-

TMF Awards
The TMF Awards are an annual television awards show broadcast live on TMF (The Music Factory).

|-
| align="center"| 2005
| Girls Aloud
| Best UK Act
|
|-

UK Video Music Awards

|-
| align="center"| 2008
| "Sexy! No No No..."
| Best Video
|
|-

Virgin Media Music Awards
The Virgin Media Music Awards are an annual awards ceremony, run by Virgin Media and announce on its official website. Girls Aloud and its members have won five awards.

|-
| rowspan="3" align="center"| 2007
| Tangled Up| Album of the Year
|
|-
| Girls Aloud
| Best UK Act
|
|-
| "Sexy! No No No..."
| Video of the Year
|
|-
| rowspan="4" align="center"| 2008
| Out of Control| Best Album
|
|-
| Out of Control| Best Album Cover
|
|-
| Girls Aloud
| Best UK Act
|
|-
| Girls Aloud
| Legend of the Year
|
|-
| rowspan="1" align="center"| 2009
| Girls Aloud
| Best Group
| 

Vodafone Live Music Awards

|-
| align="center"| 2008
| Tangled Up Tour
| Tour of the Year
|
|-

Zoo Magazine Awards
The Zoo Magazine Awards are given by men's magazine Zoo Weekly''. Girls Aloud have won one of its two nominations.

|-
| rowspan="2" align="center"| 2007
| Girls Aloud
| Best Female Band
|
|-

See also

 Girls Aloud discography
 Girls Aloud videography
 List of Girls Aloud concert tours
 List of Girls Aloud songs

References

External links
 
 

Awards
Girls Aloud